You've Got It Bad Girl is a 1973 album by the American jazz musician/producer Quincy Jones.

The title track is a song written by Yvonne Wright and Stevie Wonder and was originally released on Wonder's 1972 album Talking Book. Here Jones himself is performing the lead vocals. The album features another Stevie Wonder song: "Superstition", featuring vocals from Bill Withers, Billy Preston and Wonder himself, billed as 'Three Beautiful Brothers'.

Also included are an instrumental interpretation of the Lovin' Spoonful's "Summer in the City"; and "Sanford and Son Theme (The Streetbeater)", which was used for the opening and closing credits themes for the NBC situation comedy Sanford and Son. Jones's performance of "Summer In The City" on this album was notably sampled by The Pharcyde in their 1992 song, "Passin' Me By".

The final track on the album, "Chump Change", was first used as the main theme to 1972's The New Bill Cosby Show on CBS, where Jones's orchestra provided music. The CBS game show Now You See It used "Chump Change" as its main theme as well, both in 1974 and on its revival in 1989. It is also used as the main theme to the Dutch radio programme Langs de lijn, as well as the Norwegian Broadcasting Corporation's programme Ukeslutt.

Track listing 
 "Summer in the City" (John Sebastian, Mark Sebastian, Steve Boone) – 4:05
 "Eyes of Love" (Quincy Jones, Bob Russell) – 3:28
 Tribute to A.F.-Ro': "Daydreaming"/"First Time Ever I Saw Your Face" (Aretha Franklin)/(Ewan MacColl) – 7:11
 "Love Theme from The Getaway" (Jones) – 2:35
 "You've Got It Bad Girl" (Stevie Wonder, Yvonne Wright) – 5:45
 "Superstition" (Wonder) – 4:32
 "Manteca" (Gil Fuller, Dizzy Gillespie, Chano Pozo) – 8:42
 "Sanford and Son Theme (The Streetbeater)" (Jones) – 3:05
 "Chump Change" (Bill Cosby, Jones) – 3:19

Personnel
Dave Grusin – electric piano
Valerie Simpson – vocals
Phil Woods – alto saxophone
Tom Junior Morgan – harmonica soloist
Toots Thielemans – guitar, whistle, harmonica
Ernie Watts – saxophone
Bobbye Porter – percussion
Quincy Duke – vocals
Bob James & Creations – keyboards
Ray Brown – producer, mixing, bass 
Carol Kaye - electric bass
Chuck Rainey - electric bass 
Eddie Louis – soloist
George Duke – piano
Quincy Jones – trumpet, Arranger, Conductor, Vocals, Producer, Mixing, Soloist
Phil Ramone – Engineer
Kevin Reeves – mastering
Phil (Boogie) Schier – mixing
Cat Anderson - soloist
Grady Tate - drums

Charts
Jazz Albums: #1
R&B Albums: #14
Billboard 200: #94

References

1973 albums
Quincy Jones albums
Albums produced by Quincy Jones
Albums arranged by Quincy Jones
A&M Records albums